

Leaders of Lebowa
(Dates in italics indicate de facto continuation of office)

Political affiliation
LNP - Lebowa National Party
LPP - Lebowa People’s Party

See also
Bantustan
President of South Africa
State President of South Africa
List of prime ministers of South Africa
Governor-General of the Union of South Africa
Apartheid
List of historical unrecognized states and dependencies

Lebowa
Lebowa